Dantani Amadu (born 6 July 1998) is a Ghanaian professional footballer who plays as a midfielder for Ghanaian Premier League side Dreams F.C.

Career 
On 5 October 2018, Amadu was signed by Ghana Premier League side Dreams FC on a 3-year deal after passing his mandatory medicals. He made his debut during the 2019 GFA Normalization Committee Special Competition, on 14 April 2018, coming on in the 69th minute for Cletus Nombil Daho in a 1–1 draw against West African Football Academy (WAFA). He played 5 matches at the end of the competition. He scored his debut goal on 29 December 2019, scoring from an assist from Ibrahim Issah in a 4–1 victory over King Faisal Babes. On 5 February 2020, he scored the winning goal to help Dreams FC secure a in a 2–1 victory over Liberty Professionals. He played 6 matches and scored 2 goals during the 2019–20 Ghana Premier League season before the league was truncated due to the COVID-19 pandemic.

Ahead of the 2020–21 Ghana Premier League season, he was named on the team's squad list as the league was set to restart in November 2020.

References

External links 
 

Living people
1998 births
Association football midfielders
Ghanaian footballers